The 2022 Georgian Cup was a single knock-out football tournament, organized by Georgian Football Federation. The winner qualified for the first round of the 2023-24 UEFA Europa Conference League season.

Saburtalo Tbilisi were the holders, having beaten Samgurali in the 2021 Cup final. They were eliminated by Lokomotive Tbilisi II in the semifinals.

Torpedo Kutaisi beat Lokomotive's reserve team in the final to win the fifth Georgian Cup final and first since 2018.

Calendar

Preliminary round 
The draw for the initial two rounds was held on 18 April. It granted a bye for the third round to the winner of Egrisi – Tskhumi tie. 

The twenty six matches were played on 8–9 May. This round saw Basiani, the winner of the 2021 Amateur League season, joined by 26 teams from tier 5.

|}

First round 
This round featured two more teams of tier 5 and all 32 teams of Liga 3 and Liga 4 along with the winners of the previous round. It was skipped by Tskhumi. 

The matches were played on 26 and 27 May. 

|}

Second round 
The draw for the next two rounds held on 14 June determined the twelve ties. They were played on 6 and 7 July with the winners due to take on the clubs represented in top two divisions in early August. 
 

|}

Third Round 
Eight teams from Liga 2 and eight teams from Erovnuli Liga joined the competition at this stage with the matches played on 6–8 August.  
 

|}

Round of 16
Based on the draw held on 5 August, these ties were played on 13 and 14 September. Dinamo Batumi and Saburtalo Tbilisi, respectively the champions and Cup holders of the previous season, entered the contest in this round. 

|}

Quarterfinals
These matches were played on 12 October.

|}

Semifinals
For the first time after 2019 a fourth-tier team reached the semifinals. The games were held on 2 November. 

|}

Final 
For the first time a fourth-tier team reached the final.

See also 
 2022 Erovnuli Liga
 2022 Erovnuli Liga 2
 2022 Liga 3
 2022 Liga 4

References

External links
 Official site 

Georgian Cup seasons
Georgian Cup
Cup